Valentina Islamova (born 18 March 1992) is an ethnic Russian freestyle wrestler representing Kazakhstan. She is a bronze medalist at the World Wrestling Championships and a three-time medalist, including the gold medal in 2021, at the Asian Wrestling Championships. She represented Kazakhstan at the 2020 Summer Olympics in Tokyo, Japan.

Career 

In 2015, at the Golden Grand Prix Ivan Yarygin held in Krasnoyarsk, Russia, she won the gold medal in the women's 48 kg event. In the same year, she represented Russia at the 2015 European Games held in Baku, Azerbaijan and she won one of the bronze medals in the 48 kg event.

In 2019, she won one of the bronze medals in the 50 kg event at the 2019 Asian Wrestling Championships held in Xi'an, China. She also won one of the bronze medals in the 50 kg event at the World Wrestling Championships held in Nur-Sultan, Kazakhstan. In 2020, she repeated this result at the Asian Wrestling Championships held in New Delhi, India. In 2021, she secured the gold medal in her event at the Asian Wrestling Championships held in Almaty, Kazakhstan. A few months later, she won one of the bronze medals in her event at the 2021 Poland Open held in Warsaw, Poland.

She competed in the women's 50 kg event at the 2020 Summer Olympics held in Tokyo, Japan where she was eliminated in her first match by Lucía Yépez of Ecuador.

Achievements

References

External links 

 
 
 

Living people
1992 births
Place of birth missing (living people)
Russian female sport wrestlers
Kazakhstani female sport wrestlers
European Games medalists in wrestling
European Games bronze medalists for Russia
Wrestlers at the 2015 European Games
World Wrestling Championships medalists
Asian Wrestling Championships medalists
Wrestlers at the 2020 Summer Olympics
Olympic wrestlers of Kazakhstan
20th-century Russian women
21st-century Russian women
21st-century Kazakhstani women